Aurelia (minor planet designation: 419 Aurelia) is a main-belt asteroid that was discovered by German astronomer Max Wolf on September 7, 1896, in Heidelberg. It is classified as an F-type asteroid.

Photometric observations of this asteroid made during 2008 at the Organ Mesa Observatory in Las Cruces, New Mexico gave a "somewhat irregular" light curve with a period of 16.784 ± 0.001 hours and a brightness variation of 0.07 ± 0.01 in magnitude. When allowing for varying aspect angles and changes in mean motion, this result is consistent with past studies.

References

External links
 
 

Background asteroids
Aurelia
Aurelia
F-type asteroids (Tholen)
18960907